Dom José da Costa Nunes (15 March 1880 – 29 November 1976) was a Portuguese Cardinal of the Roman Catholic Church who served as Bishop of Macau from 1920 to 1940 and Patriarch of the East Indies from 1940 to 1953. He was made a cardinal in 1962.

Biography

José da Costa Nunes was born in Candelária, Azores, to José da Costa Nunes and his wife Francisca Felizarda de Castro Nunes. He was baptized four days later, on 19 March 1880.

After studying at the seminary in Angra, Nunes went to Macau as a missionary on 4 June 1903, and was ordained to the priesthood on the following 26 July. He then did pastoral work and taught at Macau's seminary until 1906. Nunes was named Vicar general of Macau and Timor from 1906 to 1913, when he began missionary work in Timor. He became Vicar capitular of Macau on 21 February 1917.

On 16 December 1920, Nunes was appointed Bishop of Macau by Pope Benedict XV. He received his episcopal consecration on 20 November 1921, from Bishop Emanuel da Costa, with Bishops Manuel Augusto Xavier and Francisco Nunes da Rocha serving as co-consecrators. Nunes was advanced to the Archdiocese of Goa e Damão, with title of Patriarch of the East Indies, on 11 December 1940. Resigning as Archbishop on 16 December 1953, he was made Titular Archbishop of Odessus and Vice-Camerlengo of the Holy Roman Church that same day, whilst retaining the personal title of "Patriarch".

Pope John XXIII created him Cardinal Priest of Santa Prisca in the consistory of 19 March 1962. Nunes attended the Second Vatican Council from 1962 to 1965 and he was one of the cardinal electors who participated in the 1963 papal conclave that selected Pope Paul VI. He served as the papal legate to the fourth centennial celebration of the arrival of the first Catholic missionaries to Macau on 10 November 1965.

He died in Rome at the age of 96. He was buried in the Campo Verano, but his remains, in accordance with his will, were later transferred to the church of Sant'Antonio dei Portoghesi. In his will, Nunes had also expressed his desire to be buried in the cemetery of Horta, next to his parents, if he died in Portugal.

Trivia
He founded the journal Oriente.
He was named President of the Permanent Committee of International Eucharistic Congresses on 13 July 1953.

References

External links

Cardinals of the Holy Roman Church
Catholic-Hierarchy 

20th-century Portuguese cardinals
Patriarchs of the East Indies
Participants in the Second Vatican Council
1880 births
1976 deaths
Cardinals created by Pope John XXIII
People from Pico Island
20th-century Roman Catholic bishops in Macau